A setting (or backdrop) is the time and geographic location within a narrative, either non-fiction or fiction. It is a literary element. The setting initiates the main backdrop and mood for a story. The setting can be referred to as story world or milieu to include a context (especially society) beyond the immediate surroundings of the story. Elements of setting may include culture, historical period, geography, and hour. Along with the plot, character, theme, and style, setting is considered one of the fundamental components of fiction.

Role
Setting may refer to the social milieu in which the events of a novel occur. The elements of the story setting include the passage of time, which may be static in some stories or dynamic in others with, for example, changing seasons.

A setting can take three basic forms. One is the natural world, or in an outside place. In this setting, the natural landscapes of the world play an important part in a narrative, along with living creatures and different times of weather conditions and seasons. The second form exists as the cultural and historical background in which the narrative resides. Past events that have impacted the cultural background of characters or locations are significant in this way. The third form of a setting is a public or private place that has been created/maintained and/or resided in by people. Examples of this include a house, a park, a street, a school, etc.

Types
Setting may take various forms:
 Alternate history
 Campaign setting
 Constructed world
 Dream world
 Dystopia
 Fantasy world
 Fictional city
 Fictional country
 Fictional crossover
 Fictional location
 Fictional universe
 Future history
 Imaginary world
 Mythical place
 Parallel universe
 Planets in science fiction
 Simulated reality
 Utopia
 Virtual reality

See also
 British regional literature
 Index of fictional places
 Landscape
 List of fictional universes
 Setting
 Worldbuilding

Notes

References
 
 
 
 
 
 

 
Creative works
Narratology